Inquoris Desmond Chade Johnson (born February 12, 1986) is an American motivational speaker and former college football player. His football career ended in 2006 at the University of Tennessee with an injury that permanently paralyzed his right arm. Johnson went on to study psychology and became a motivational speaker. He has been the keynote speaker at numerous events, including the Greater Knoxville Sports Hall of Fame induction ceremony.

Early life
Johnson grew up in a household of 14 people in the Kirkwood neighborhood of Atlanta, Georgia. The son of Ruby Kay Lewis and stepfather Ricky Lewis Sr., he was a star football player at what was then the Alonzo A. Crim Comprehensive High School.

Personal life
Johnson is a Christian. Johnson is married to Allison Johnson. They have two children.

See also
 2005 Tennessee Volunteers football team
 2006 Tennessee Volunteers football team

References

Further reading
 

Audio/video

External links
 
 2005 Tennessee Volunteers roster
 2006 Tennessee Volunteers roster
 Air Force vs. Tennessee – Game Summary (September 9, 2006) from ESPN
 
 
 

1986 births
American motivational speakers
Living people
Place of birth missing (living people)
Players of American football from Atlanta
Players of American football from Tennessee
Tennessee Volunteers football players